Bogić Popović (born 10 March 1974) is a former Serbian footballer.

Career

Hajduk Belgrade
In the 1999–00 Hajduk Beograd season, Popović scored 14 goals in the 1999–2000 First League of FR Yugoslavia. Tall and heavy, he made use of his physical characteristics in order to become a prolific goalscorer in the First and Second leagues of FR Yugoslavia.

Hammarby IF
After seeing video tapes of Popović and fellow Yugoslav player Dragan Vasiljević, Hammarby bought the two players, Popović for 4 million kronor. Popović played one match for Hammarby IF, the 0–1 loss against GIF Sundsvall in the 2000 Allsvenskan première. After argues with Hammarby coach Sören Cratz, he left Hammarby in June 2000.

By summer 2012 he was the director of the youth sections of Hajduk Beograd and still holding that post by March 2015.

References

1974 births
Living people
Footballers from Belgrade
Association football forwards
Yugoslav footballers
Serbian footballers
First League of Serbia and Montenegro players
Allsvenskan players
FK Hajduk Beograd players
OFK Beograd players
FK Železnik players
Hammarby Fotboll players
Expatriate footballers in Sweden
Serbian expatriate footballers